Federico Bianchi may refer to:

 Federico Bianchi (painter) (1635–1719), Italian painter of the Baroque
 Federico Bianchi (soccer) (born 1983), American former professional soccer player